Lithogyalideopsis is a genus of lichen-forming fungi in the family Gomphillaceae.

Species
Lithogyalideopsis aterrima 
Lithogyalideopsis poeltii 
Lithogyalideopsis vivantii 
Lithogyalideopsis zelandica

References

Ostropales genera
Ostropales
Lichen genera
Taxa described in 2005
Taxa named by Emmanuël Sérusiaux
Taxa named by Antonín Vězda